Eldis Bajrami (born 12 December 1992) is a Macedonian-Albanian footballer who plays as a midfielder for FCM Traiskirchen.

Club career
He was loaned out to Admira Wacker Mödling on 5 June 2014, after making 31 appearances and scoring 3 goals during that loan spell he joined Admira permanently on 28 April 2015 for an undisclosed fee.

International career
Despite born in Austria, he made his international debut for the Macedonian U-21 national team.

References

External links

1992 births
Living people
Footballers from Vienna
Austrian people of Macedonian descent
Austrian people of Albanian descent
Albanian footballers from North Macedonia
Association football midfielders
Austrian footballers
Macedonian footballers
North Macedonia under-21 international footballers
SK Rapid Wien players
FC Admira Wacker Mödling players
SKN St. Pölten players
Austrian Football Bundesliga players